Peter and Jonathan Newmyer Farm is a historic farm and national historic district located at Bullskin Township, Fayette County, Pennsylvania.  The district includes 8 contributing buildings and 1 contributing structure.  They are the main German bank barn (c. 1794-1798), main house (c. 1812-1822), straw / hay shed (c. 1900), corn crib (c. 1875-1900), smokehouse, stone spring house, coal shanty (c. 1875-1900), wheat shed (c. 1900-1940), and tenant house (pre-1840).

It was added to the National Register of Historic Places in 1998.  As of 2011, it was owned by Tony Mucha and his wife Rose.  It is one of the earliest stone barns in Western Pennsylvania.  The whole property is

References

Farms on the National Register of Historic Places in Pennsylvania
Historic districts on the National Register of Historic Places in Pennsylvania
Buildings and structures in Fayette County, Pennsylvania
National Register of Historic Places in Fayette County, Pennsylvania